The End of the World (stylized in all caps) is Mucc's twelfth full-length album, released on June 25, 2014. It was released in two different versions, the Limited version including a bonus DVD with documentary footage.

Background
In 2013, Mucc began looking for two new members who would participate in recording, photo shoots and interviews. Applicants had to send in five stickers included with CDs, DVDs and other goods, released in commemoration of the band's 15th anniversary along with an application; it was noted that they did not need to know how to play an instrument. The winners were selected by Mucc's four primary members themselves and given stage names, after interviews and reviewing resumes on a live broadcast on Niconico on July 26. Hancho, a Hungarian female study abroad student from the band's native Ibaraki, and Dean, a male office worker from Chiba Prefecture officially joined the band on August 17. However, on September 4, roughly two weeks later, it was announced that both had left the group. Dean left after his parents found out he had joined a rock band by seeing him on TV, and Hancho stated she had achieved her dream of joining Mucc and could now leave to become a fan once more:

On December 1, 2013, Mucc gave a free performance in Amerikamura's Triangle Park to an estimated 3,000 fans. On June 25, 2014, the band announced the release of The End of the World and toured for the album.

Track listing 

Notes
"The End of the World", "Ender Ender", "Halo" and "Japanese" are stylized in all caps.

References

2014 albums
Mucc albums
Sony Music Entertainment Japan albums